The Minister of European Affairs was a ministerial title related to European Affairs.

List of ministers

References

Lists of government ministers of Denmark
Government ministerial offices of Denmark
1966 establishments in Denmark